The Neptuno is a semi-submersible accommodation vessel.

Particulars 
The vessel design is an OCEAN 500 by SBM Offshore subsidiary GustoMSC. It is a dynamically positioned (DP3) accommodation and construction support semi-submersible for harsh environments. The Neptuno was delivered in January 2015, built by COSCO (Nantong) Shipyard CO. Ltd. Since April 2015 the Neptuno has been working in the Cantarell Field, Mexico as an offshore construction and maintenance service vessel operated by COTEMAR S.A de C.V.

The Neptuno has an accommodation capacity of 750 people, divided in 36 single bed cabins, 29 double bed cabins and 164 4-bed cabins. Each cabin is fitted with a private bathroom, daylight, and IT/TV facilities. It is equipped with galley and mess rooms for 300 people in one seating. Recreation facilities include cinema, recreation rooms, game rooms and gym. There is a hospital with easy access to the helideck. An elevator is available to all decks. The Neptuno also has several office spaces.

The Neptuno is equipped to support Sikorsky S92 and S61N helicopters operations, all in compliance with class and regulations established for helicopters. A helicopter re-fueling system is situated close to the helideck area.

The Neptuno is provided with a Class 3 dynamic positioning system. The DP System has 6 reference systems with different working principles.

The Neptuno has 2 Heavy lift Offshore Cranes, 1 LIEBHERR 300 tons crane type BOS 14000-300 and 1 LIEBHERR 75 tons crane type BOS 4200-75.

The vessel has a 2000 m² main deck and a large Workshop.

The Neptuno is prepared for ROV operations and has a designated area for surface diving.

The vessel has a telescopic gangway for personnel transit with an operational longitude of 38.5 meters. The Neptuno also has a boarding gangway for boat-to-platform personnel transferring with an operational length of 24.3 meters.

History 
The Neptuno was built by COSCO (Nantong) Shipyard CO, the keel was laid in 2013 and delivered to Neptuno Offshore PTE LTD on 5 January 2015. Five days later the Neptuno left China heading to Campeche Bay, Mexico. On 17 April 2015 the Neptuno started operations serving PEMEX, connecting the gangway at Akal-J complex.

References 

Semi-submersibles
2015 ships